Geffery Noblet  (14 September 1916 – 16 August 2006) was an Australian cricketer who played in three Test matches from 1950 to 1953.

Noblet's bowling performance in the 1948–49 Australian domestic season was the best by a South Australian bowler in 38 seasons. Noblet took 38 wickets at 15.4, the best for any South Australian taking ten wickets or more in a season since Robert Rees took 10/129 in 1909–10.

Following Noblet's selection in the Australian team to tour South Africa in 1949–50, the South Australian Cricket Association presented Noblet and fellow South Australian Gil Langley with a gift of their own choosing. Noblet asked for a set of coffee tables and Langley a combination of a standard electric lamp, coffee tray and ashtray.

Noblet got his unusual first name when a family friend, given the task of registering the birth, spelt Noblet's first name as Geffery rather than Jeffery. Noblet himself was not aware of the legal spelling of his name until adulthood when he saw his birth certificate.

Noblet was awarded the Medal of the Order of Australia in 1995 for service to cricket.

During World War Two Noblet served in the transport division of the Australian Army.

References

1916 births
2006 deaths
Australia Test cricketers
South Australia cricketers
Commonwealth XI cricketers
Australian cricketers
Cricketers from Adelaide
Recipients of the Medal of the Order of Australia
D. G. Bradman's XI cricketers